Java rice is a dish originating in the Philippines. It is a type of fried rice that utilizes turmeric as main flavor.

See also 
 Nasi Kuning
 Philippine adobo
 Nasi Goreng
 Fried rice

Philippine rice dishes